The 7th constituency of Essonne is a French legislative constituency in the Essonne département.

Description

The 7th constituency of Essonne is a suburban seat in the north of the department bordering Val-de-Marne. The seat was created in 1988 as the number of seats in Essonne was increased from four to ten.

The victory of Éva Sas of EELV at the 2012 elections was the first time the left had won the seat in a general election since the 1988 election.

Historic Representation

Election results

2022

 
 
 
 
 
 
 
|-
| colspan="8" bgcolor="#E9E9E9"|
|-

2017

 
 
 
 
 
 
|-
| colspan="8" bgcolor="#E9E9E9"|
|-

2012

 
 
 
 
 
 
 
|-
| colspan="8" bgcolor="#E9E9E9"|
|-

2007

 
 
 
 
 
 
 
|-
| colspan="8" bgcolor="#E9E9E9"|
|-

2002

 
 
 
 
 
 
|-
| colspan="8" bgcolor="#E9E9E9"|
|-

1997

 
 
 
 
 
 
 
 
|-
| colspan="8" bgcolor="#E9E9E9"|
|-

Sources

Official results of French elections from 2002: "Résultats électoraux officiels en France" (in French).

7